"The Terrapin" is a short story by Patricia Highsmith. Based on the difficult relationship Highsmith had with her own mother, the story revolves around a young boy, Victor, who is emotionally abused by his difficult, haughty mother, an illustrator of children's books. 

The terrapin of the title, a small tortoise purchased by his mother for cooking, suffers an agonizing death when she drops it into the boiling pan. This event pushes Victor over the edge—he believes he heard it scream—and during the night he butchers his mother with a kitchen knife. The story ends while he is being examined by doctors in a psychiatric hospital.

Many critics have compared "The Terrapin" to Lewis Carroll's poem "The Walrus and the Carpenter", featured in Alice's Adventures in Wonderland, in which the title characters befriend a bunch of oysters and then eat them.

Accolades
 1963 : Nominee, Edgar Allan Poe Award, Best Short Story, Mystery Writers of America  (in Ellery Queen's Mystery Magazine)
 1963 : Special Award, Mystery Writers of America

References

Terrapin
Child abuse in fiction
Horror short stories
Matricide in fiction
Works by Patricia Highsmith